Digeut (sign: ㄷ; South Korean: 디귿, digeut; North Korean: 디읃, dieut) is a consonant in the Korean alphabet. The Unicode for ㄷ is U+3137. Depending on its position, it makes a 'd' or a 't' sound. In an initial or final position in a word, the pronunciation is usually [t], while after a vowel it is pronounced [d], for example in the word deudieo (드디어, "finally"), the initial ㄷ is [t], while the second ㄷ is [d].

Stroke order

Other communicative representations

References 

Hangul jamo